In Pakistan, the Diploma of Associate Engineer or DAE is a three-year, post-secondary (post-grade 10) diploma in various engineering disciplines such as electrical engineering, electronics engineering, civil engineering, mechanical engineering or chemical engineering.

Background 
The diploma, which was first developed in 1950, includes regular studies with classroom lectures, workshop assignments, laboratory experiments, industrial projects and industrial tours. The diploma is awarded by the Punjab, Khyber Pakhtunkhwa and Sindh Boards of Technical Education. A student can be admitted to this course after passing grade 10 (Secondary School Certificate or SSC in science subjects or Technical School Certificate or TSC). The government of Pakistan recognizes it as equivalent to Higher Secondary School Certificate or HSSC (grade 12) pre-engineering for further study purposes. Hundreds of government and private institutes across the country offer this diploma.

After successful completion of the diploma, students can either join Bachelor of Engineering (BE) and Bachelor of Technology (BTech) degree programs or find employment as supervisors, foremen, technicians, sub-engineers, draftsmen, overseers, chemical or gas plant operators, junior instructors or workshop superintendents.

Regional variations 

 At the federal level, the National Vocational and Technical Training Commission is the responsible government body for technical education.
 In the Punjab, the Punjab Board of Technical Education and the Technical Education and Vocational Training Authority are the responsible government bodies for technical education.
 In Sindh, the Sindh Board of Technical Education and the Sindh Technical Education and Vocational Training Authority are the responsible government bodies for technical education.
 In Khyber Pakhtunkhwa, the Khyber Pakhtunkhwa Board of Technical Education and the Technical Education and Vocational Training Authority are the responsible government bodies for technical education.
 In Balochistan, the Balochistan Technical Education and Vocational Training Authority is the responsible government body for technical education.
 In Azad Kashmir, the Azad Jammu & Kashmir Technical Education and Vocational Training Authority is the responsible government body for technical education.

References 

Vocational education in Pakistan